The 2009 Formula Nippon Championship was the thirty-seventh season of the premier Japanese open-wheel motor racing series. The series for Formula Nippon racing cars was contested over eight rounds. Nakajima Racing's Loïc Duval claimed four victories en route to the championship, ending a six-year streak of championships by the Impul team.

Teams and drivers
 All drivers competed in Swift 017.n chassis and Honda HR09E or Toyota RV8K engines.

Race calendar and results

 All races held in Japan.
 Okayama was replaced by Autopolis.

Championship standings

Drivers' Championship

Scoring system

Teams' Championship

Scoring system

External links
2009 Japanese Championship Formula Nippon

Formula Nippon
Super Formula
Nippon